Dharma Seelan is a 1993 Tamil language film directed by Cheyyar Ravi. The film stars Prabhu in dual roles as father and son and Khushbu whilst Napoleon, Geetha and Salim Ghouse play supporting roles. The film was released on 16 July 1993.

Plot 
Thamizh Selvan, an orphan who works in a hospital, tries to discover the truth of his parentage. Though the head of his orphanage claims that a recently deceased nun was his mother, others deny it. So Thamizh teams up with a reporter Durga, he meets at the nun's wake, and the two work to unearth the facts.

Cast 

Prabhu as SP Dharma Seelan (Father) and Thamizh Selvan (Son)
Khushbu as Durga
Napoleon as Vaappa
Geetha as Parvathi
Salim Ghouse as Pradeep Chakravarthi
Manorama as Mother Mary
Goundamani as Aarusamy
Senthil as Dindigul Sahayam

Soundtrack 

The film score and the soundtrack were composed by Ilaiyaraaja. The soundtrack, released in 1993, features 8 tracks with lyrics written by Vaali, Pulamaipithan, Gangai Amaran and R. V. Udayakumar.

Reception
The Indian Express wrote "A gripping screenplay, taut narration and some fine performances make Dharmaseelan a film worth watching".

References 

1993 films
Indian action films
Indian films about revenge
Films scored by Ilaiyaraaja
1990s Tamil-language films
Fictional portrayals of the Tamil Nadu Police
1993 action films
Films scored by Karthik Raja